Jar with a Twist (also stylized Jar-with-a-Twist and Jar~with~a~Twist) is a peanut butter jar with a rotating bottom functioning similar to a deodorant stick by raising its contents towards the top for easier access.

History and design
The creators of the jar, Michael Bissette, Stephen Smith, Spencer Vaughn, and Sean Echevarria, developed the concept for the jar during a senior design project while at North Carolina State University. Their original plan was to create a squeegee knife that never would never get dirty below the handle, but soon realized that the primary problem was in retrieving peanut butter from nearly empty containers. Their concept was feasibility-tested, using PVC pipe and a makeshift plug, and then prototyped utilizing the university's 3D printers. 

A patent was filed for the finished concept in June 2013. The university newspaper, Technician, described the finished product:

The jars are made using injection-molded using PET plastic. The company claims that the shelf life of its contents, once opened, will match that of a normal peanut butter jar at 3 to 6 months.

The team is planning on introducing the jar into the peanut butter market and then expanding their design to jelly, salsa, and mayonnaise containers. Each jar is expected manufacturing cost $0.13 to manufacture, which is three cents more than the manufacturing cost of a typical peanut butter jar. One cent of each unit's manufacturing cost will be a licensing fee for the Jar with a Twist company.

Press coverage
Jar with a Twist was covered in North Carolina State's Technician article on August 22, 2013. It was on The Huffington Post website, which claimed it was "a brilliant idea". Gizmodo published a story about the jar with the title "The Peanut Butter Jar Has Been Perfected". Nadine DeNinno of the International Business Times said the product's invention was "a stroke of genius". The jar has also been featured on ABC News, Foodbeast, the Winnipeg Free Press, and Slate.

References

External links
 

Peanut butter
Products introduced in 2013